Esa Einari Kervinen (26 December 1929 – 6 April 2016) was a Finnish sport shooter who competed in the 1960 Summer Olympics, in the 1964 Summer Olympics and in the 1972 Summer Olympics.

References

1929 births
2016 deaths
Finnish male sport shooters
ISSF rifle shooters
Olympic shooters of Finland
Shooters at the 1960 Summer Olympics
Shooters at the 1964 Summer Olympics
Shooters at the 1972 Summer Olympics
People from Vieremä
Sportspeople from North Savo